Ohtani-ike is an earthfill dam located in Gifu Prefecture in Japan. The dam is used for irrigation. The catchment area of the dam is 1.2 km2. The dam impounds about 4  ha of land when full and can store 161 thousand cubic meters of water. The construction of the dam was completed in 1914.

References

Dams in Gifu Prefecture